"More than That" is a song by American boy band Backstreet Boys. It was released on April 17, 2001, as the third single from their fourth studio album, Black & Blue (2000). The song was written by Adam Anders, Franciz, and LePont and produced by the latter two.

"More than That" reached number 27 on the US Billboard Hot 100 and ran for 20 weeks, and number 12 on the UK Singles Chart, ending their 13th consecutive top-10 run, the last being "The Call" which peaked at number eight. It performed poorly compared to other singles of the Backstreet Boys, failing to reach the top 10 in any of their main markets. The song appears on the band's first compilation album, The Hits – Chapter One (2001).

Music video
The music video was directed by Marcus Raboy. The video features two sets of scenes: one in which the band sings in a desert hangar with a large movie screen behind them showing various scenes behind them, including a desert, a city with a busy traffic, a cloudy sky, lightning, and sunbreak. The other scenes feature the band both walking in the desert, as a group, and driving in two convertible cars. One with AJ McLean as the driver and Nick Carter as the passenger. The other one with Brian Littrell as the driver, Howie Dorough as the passenger, and Kevin Richardson in the backseat.

Track listings

Australian and New Zealand CD single
 "More Than That" (radio mix) – 3:40
 "More Than That" (album version) – 3:44
 "The Call" (Neptunes remix with rap) – 3:53
 "More Than That" (Hani Mixshow remix) – 6:36
 "More Than That" (enhanced video) – 3:54

European CD single
 "More Than That" (radio mix) – 3:40
 "More Than That" (album version) – 3:44

UK CD and cassette single
 "More Than That" (radio mix) – 3:40
 "More Than That" (Hani Mix Show remix) – 6:36
 "The Call" (Neptunes remix with rap) – 3:53

Japanese CD single
 "More Than That" (radio mix) – 3:42
 "More Than That" (album version) – 3:44
 "The Call" (Neptunes remix with rap) – 3:53
 "The Call" (Earthtone III remix) – 3:44

Charts

Weekly charts

Year-end charts

Certifications

Release history

References

2000 songs
2001 singles
Backstreet Boys songs
Jive Records singles
Music videos directed by Marcus Raboy
Songs written by Adam Anders